The 1987 Northwest Territories general election was held on October 5, 1987.

This was the last election in which Elections Canada would administer the elections.

Election Results

The election was held in 24 constituencies with 15,901 ballots cast, a turnout of 71.56%.

Outgoing Premier Nick Sibbeston ran for re-election but was replaced by Dennis Patterson who served out the entire term.

Election summary

Candidates

References

External links
Legislative Assembly Report Fall autumn 1987

1987 elections in Canada
Elections in the Northwest Territories
October 1987 events in Canada
1987 in the Northwest Territories